Nebojša Đurić, (born October 17, 1987, in Užice) is a disabled athlete from Serbia. He competes in discus throws in the F56 classification and in shot put in the F55 classification.
He won a gold medal  in the F56 discus throws at the 2018 European Championships and bronze medal in the F55 shot put at the 2019 World Championships in Dubai.
in November 2010 he was involved in a traffic accident that resulted in paralysis below the waist.

References

External links
- Nebojša Đurić Profile

Paralympic athletes of Serbia
Living people
1987 births
Sportspeople from Užice
Track and field athletes with disabilities
Serbian people with disabilities
Male competitors in athletics with disabilities
Serbian male shot putters
Serbian male discus throwers
Athletes (track and field) at the 2016 Summer Paralympics
Athletes (track and field) at the 2020 Summer Paralympics
World Para Athletics Championships winners
Medalists at the World Para Athletics European Championships